Plicisyrinx is a genus of sea snails, marine gastropod mollusks in the family Pseudomelatomidae.

Species
Species within the genus Plicisyrinx include:

 Plicisyrinx binicostata Sysoev & Kantor, 1986
 Plicisyrinx decapitata Sysoev & Kantor, 1986
 Plicisyrinx plicata (Okutani, 1964)
 Plicisyrinx vitjazi Sysoev & Kantor, 1986

References

External links
 
 Bouchet, P.; Kantor, Y. I.; Sysoev, A.; Puillandre, N. (2011). A new operational classification of the Conoidea (Gastropoda). Journal of Molluscan Studies. 77(3): 273-308

 
Pseudomelatomidae
Gastropod genera